TALAIR was a Papua New Guinea airline founded in 1952.  It ceased operations in 1993.

Company history

Talair had its origins as Territory Airlines, founded in 1952 as a charter company.  It operated to towns throughout the country where the only means of communication was by air.  Its bases of operations were Lae and Madang.  The aircraft used were small Cessna and Beechcraft types.

Territory Airlines was granted scheduled flight rights in 1968 from Goroka.  Soon it was serving over 50 destinations in the territory.  In 1971 it took over Sepik Air Charters and in 1975 took over MAC Air Charter and now the destinations grew to over 100.

The need to fly to all types of destinations forced Territory Airlines to have a very varied fleet, but the mainstay of the fleet were the Britten-Norman Islander and the DHC-6 Twin Otter.

In 1975 the name was changed to Talair Tourist Airlines of Niugini and soon it took over Panda Air and the network grew to over 150 destinations.    In the late 70's the DeHavilland Canada Twin Otters [DHC-6]and then the Embraer EMB110 aircraft were introduced to Papua New Guinea. In 1986 the DHC-8 was placed into service.  By 1990 the fleet had grown to over 50 aircraft but the operating costs of keeping such a varied fleet flying resulted in a reduction of flights.  With financial difficulties mounting, on May 25, 1993 TALAIR ceased all flights and the aircraft were transferred to Flight West Airlines of Australia.

Fleet details
TALAIR operated many different types of aircraft many of which are not listed here.
de Havilland DH-84 Dragon
Piper Aztec
Cessna 185
Cessna 206
Cessna 336
Cessna 402
Beechcraft Baron
Beechcraft Queen Air
Pilatus Porter
Britten-Norman Islander
DHC-6 Twin Otter
Embraer EMB 110 Bandeirante
DHC-8
Cessna Citation

External links
Data
TALAIR reunion website
Timetable Images
TALAIR accidents
TALAIR plane photo

References

Defunct airlines of Papua New Guinea
Airlines established in 1952
Airlines disestablished in 1993
Airlines of Papua New Guinea